The course sand ctenotus (Ctenotus piankai)  is a species of skink found in Australia.

References

piankai
Reptiles described in 1969
Taxa named by Glen Milton Storr